Isabelle Marie Kadzban Mahoney (born 20 December 2001) is an American-born Chilean footballer who plays as a forward for Florida Kraze Krush and the Chile women's national team.

International career
Kadzban qualifies to play for Chile through her maternal grandmother, a Rapa Nui from the Easter Island. She made her senior debut on 6 October 2019.

References

External links

2001 births
Living people
Citizens of Chile through descent
Chilean women's footballers
Women's association football forwards
Chile women's international footballers
Chilean people of American descent
Chilean people of Rapanui descent
Sportspeople from Grand Rapids, Michigan
Soccer players from Michigan
American women's soccer players
American people of Chilean descent
American people of Rapanui descent